The Central Plantation Crops Research Institute (CPCRI) was established in 1916 as Central Coconut Research Station, and was later taken over by the Indian Council of Agricultural Research (ICAR). ICAR established CPCRI in 1970 by merging Central Coconut Research Stations at Kasaragod and Kayamkulam as well as Central Arecanut Research Station, Vittal and its five substations at Palode (Kerala), Kannara (Kerala), Hirehalli (Karnataka), Mohitnagar (West Bengal) and Kahikuchi (Assam). The research centers of CPCRI for spices, cashew, oil palm, and coastal agriculture had been upgraded to independent institutes and directorates.

At present, CPCRI focuses on research in coconut, areca nut, and cocoa. The headquarters of the institute is situated at Kasaragod, Kerala and the two regional stations are at Kayamkulum (Kerala) and Vittal (Karnataka). There are four research centres for the institute viz., Mohitnagar (West Bengal), Kahikuchi (Assam) and Kidu (Karnataka).

Besides, there are two KVKs (Kasaragod and Kayamkulum) under the institute. All India Co-ordinated Coconut and Arecanut Improvement Project (AICCAIP) started functioning from 1972 at CPCRI, Kasaragod and later renamed as All India Coordinated Research Project on Palms (AICRP) in 1986. The AICRP has 14 centres on coconut, 4 on oilpalm and one on palmyrah.

References

Education in Kasaragod
1916 establishments in India
Buildings and structures in Kasaragod district
Indian Council of Agricultural Research
Research institutes in Kerala
Agriculture in Kerala